Drigh Bala ( ، ) is a historical town in Johi Taluka of Dadu District , Sindh, Pakistan , located in Kachho desert near the Nai Gaj , established by Talpur Amirs during early Kalhora period. The graveyard of Mir Allahyar Talpur-I is situated close to this town.  This necropolis of Kalhora Dynasty and Talpur Dynasty is a historical heritage of Sindh near this town. The education facility is available in the town at secondary level. The Rural Health Center is working as well.

References 

Towns in Pakistan
Dadu District